Jean Claude Gandur (born 18 February 1949) is a French-born Swiss businessman.

Early life
Jean Claude Gandur was born in Grasse, France in 1949. Gandur studied law and political science at the University of Lausanne and history at Pantheon-Sorbonne University.

Career
Gandur started as an oil trader. He was chairman and CEO of Addax Petroleum until its takeover by Sinopec Group in August 2009 for US$7.3 billion.

His new Toronto-listed oil company Oryx Petroleum held its IPO in 2013, and it is developing large oilfields in Iraqi Kurdistan. As of March 2015, his net worth was estimated at $2.1 billion.

In July 2020, Gandur resigned from the board of directors at Oryx Petroleum, following a change in control.

Art 
In 2018, Gandur was part of the jury for the Marcel Duchamp Prize. Gandur, who works with international organizations as an art collector, participated in an interview regarding the correct provenance of objects for sale in April 2018.

In January 2019, Gandur, together with other private donors and some countries, made a donation totalling USD 75,5 million for the safeguarding of cultural heritage sites in Iraq and Mali.

References

1949 births
Living people
Swiss businesspeople
Swiss billionaires
Swiss chief executives
People from Grasse
University of Lausanne alumni